Vatnshyrna was a major Icelandic saga codex destroyed in the Copenhagen Fire of 1728. It was copied between 1391 and 1395 by Magnús Þórhallsson for Jón Hákonarson in northern Iceland. The codex was first called Vatnshyrna by Arngrímur Jónsson in his 1609 work, Crymogaea, possibly because it was located at that time at Stóra Vatnshorn.

Arngrímur refers to the codex containing the texts of Kjalnesinga saga, Þórðar saga hreðu, and Bárðar saga Snæfellsáss. A large part of the manuscript subsequently became part of Peder Resen's manuscript collection, and in 1675 this portion of the codex passed to Copenhagen University Library. At this point, the manuscript contained the following texts:
 Flóamanna saga
 Laxdæla saga
 Hænsna-Þóris saga
 Vatnsdæla saga
 Eyrbyggja saga
 Kjalnesinga saga
 Króka-Refs saga
 Stjörnu-Odda draumr
 Bergbúa þáttr
 Kumlbúa þáttr
 Draumr Þorsteins Síðu-Hallssonar
Although destroyed in the fire, copies of all these texts, apart from Króka-Refs saga, had been made by Árni Magnússon and Ásgeir Jónsson. Margaret Clunies Ross has suggested that the manuscript's contents represent the compiler's "taste for the marvellous and the supernatural".

A related codex, Pseudo-Vatnshyrna, which was compiled in the same area and at the same time (c. 1390) as Vatnshyrna survives as fragments in AM 445b 4to, AM 445c 4to and AM 564a 4to. It contained at least the following texts:
 Landnámabók (Melabók text)
 Vatnsdæla saga
 Flóamanna saga
 Eyrbyggja saga
 Bárðar saga Snæfellsáss
 Þórðar saga hreðu
 Bergbúa þáttr
 Kumlbúa þáttr
 Draumr Þorsteins Síðu-Hallssonar
 Gísla saga
 Víga-Glúms saga
 Harðar saga ok Hólmverja

References

External links 
 

14th-century books
Icelandic manuscripts